Days of Love is a 1954 Italian comedy film directed by Giuseppe De Santis.

Cast
 Marcello Mastroianni as Pasquale Droppio
 Marina Vlady as Angela Cafalla
 Giulio Calì as Pietro Cafalla, nonno di Angela
 Angelina Longobardi as Concetta Cafalla, madre di Angela
 Dora Scarpetta as Nunziata, sorella di Angela
 Fernando Jacovolta as Adolfo Cafalla, fratello di Angela
 Renato Chiantoni as Francesco, zio di Angela
 Lucien Gallas as Oreste Droppio, padre di Pasquale
 Cosimo Poerio as Onorato Droppio, nonno di Pasquale
 Pina Gallini as Filomena Droppio, nonna di Pasquale
 Angelina Chiusano as Loreta Droppio, madre di Pasquale
 Franco Avallone as Leopoldo Droppio, fratello di Pasquale
 Santina Tucci as Teresa Droppio, sorella di Pasquale
 Gildo Bocci as Il maresciallo
 Pietro Tordi as Il parroco

References

External links

1954 films
1954 comedy-drama films
Italian comedy-drama films
1950s Italian-language films
Films directed by Giuseppe De Santis
Films directed by Leopoldo Savona
Films scored by Mario Nascimbene
1950s Italian films